Nizhny Byk is a rural locality (a selo) in Beryozovskoye Rural Settlement, Vorobyovsky District, Voronezh Oblast, Russia. The population was 271 as of 2010. There are 6 streets.

Geography 
Nizhny Byk is located 24 km northeast of Vorobyovka (the district's administrative centre) by road. Mirny is the nearest rural locality.

References 

Rural localities in Vorobyovsky District